Midvale is a suburb of Perth, Western Australia, which is split between the City of Swan and the Shire of Mundaring. Its postcode is 6056.

Developed in the early 1950s, the area was named as a composite of Midland and the former Helena Vale Racecourse. The former racecourse site is now part of Midvale.

Its southern boundary is the Great Eastern Highway, and eastern the Eastern Railway.

A substantial amount of the housing in the suburb is known as State Housing; a significant amount of this housing was redeveloped by the Department of Housing under the "Eastern Horizons New Living Project".

References

External links
 Midvale on Geoscience Australia
 Mundaring and Hills Historical Society website

Suburbs and localities in the Shire of Mundaring
Suburbs of Perth, Western Australia
Suburbs and localities in the City of Swan